Proszynellus wandae is a jumping spider species in the genus Proszynellus. The species was first identified in 2015 by the Polish aracnologists Barbara Maria Patoleta and Marek Michał Żabka. The species is named in honour of Wanda Wesołowska.

Distribution
Proszynellus wandae is found in Western Australia.

References

Spiders of Australia
Salticidae
Spiders described in 2015